Sâncel is a commune located in Alba County, Transylvania, Romania. It has a population of 2,790 and is composed of three villages: Iclod (Küküllőiklód), Pănade (Pánád), and Sâncel.

Natives
 (1929–2019), writer, politician, and diplomat
Timotei Cipariu (1805–1887), cleric and academic, one of the founding members of the Romanian Academy
 (1869–?), educator, delegate at the Great National Assembly of Alba Iulia

References

Communes in Alba County
Localities in Transylvania